The 15th Pan American Games were held in Rio de Janeiro, Brazil from 13 July 2007 to 29 July 2007.

Medals

Silver

Men's Individual Road Race: Emile Abraham

Bronze

Women's Shot Put: Cleopatra Borel-Brown

Men's 50m Freestyle: George Bovell

Men's – 80 kg: Chinedum Osuji

External links
Rio 2007 Official website
T&T Olympic Committee

Nations at the 2007 Pan American Games
P
2007